Roger Blank (born December 19, 1938, New York City) is an American jazz drummer.

Blank's grandfather played saxophone and his father William Blank was a trumpeter who had performed with Cootie Williams. Blank worked with Hank Mobley in Harlem for several years and studied under Charlie Persip. He worked with Sun Ra starting in 1964 and recorded several times with him. He worked extensively on the New York jazz scene in the 1960s and 1970s; he played with and was influenced by Ornette Coleman, and helped found a group called the Melodic Art-Tet in 1971 which was devoted to playing in Coleman's harmolodic style. This group also included Charles Brackeen, Ahmed Abdullah, William Parker, and Ronnie Boykins. Other associations included work with Bill Barron, Don Cherry, John Coltrane, Dennis Charles, Walt Dickerson, Kenny Dorham, Frank Foster, Charles Greenlee, John Hicks, Ken McIntyre, Pharoah Sanders, Archie Shepp, and Charles Tolliver. Blank appeared on the piece "Hambone" with Shepp on the 1965 live album The New Wave in Jazz. He relocated to Atlanta in the 1980s and led an ensemble there, but moved back to New York in the 1990s, where he lived in the Williamsburg neighborhood.

His daughter Radha Blank is a filmmaker, writer, and actress, known for the Sundance-winning film The 40-Year-Old Version.

Discography

As sideman

With Albert Ayler
 Holy Ghost: Rare & Unissued Recordings (1962–70) (Revenant, 2004) one track

With Earl Cross
 Jazz of the Seventies: Sam Rivers Tuba Trio & Earl Cross Sextet (Circle, 1977)

With Walt Dickerson
 Impressions of a Patch of Blue (MGM, 1966)

With Frank Foster
 Shiny Stockings (Denon, 1977)

With Andrew Hill
 Nefertiti (East Wind, 1976)

With Leroy Jenkins and the Jazz Composer's Orchestra
 For Players Only (JCOA, 1975)

With Clifford Jordan
 The Complete Clifford Jordan Strata-East Sessions (Mosaic, 2017)

With Jimmy Lyons
 Push Pull (Hathut, 1979)

With The Melodic Art-Tet (with Charles Brackeen, Ahmed Abdullah, William Parker, and Ramadan Mumeen
 Melodic Art–Tet (NoBusiness, 2013)

With Sam Rivers
 Crystals (Impulse!, 1974)

With Pharoah Sanders
 Tauhid (Impulse!, 1967)
 Priceless Jazz Collection (compilation) (GRP, 1997)
 Anthology: You’ve Got to Have Freedom (compilation) (Soul Brother, 2005)
 The Impulse Story (compilation) (Impulse!, 2006)

With Archie Shepp
 The New Wave in Jazz (Impulse!, 1965) one track

With Sun Ra
 Other Planes of There (Saturn, 1966)
 The Magic City (Saturn, 1966)
 The Heliocentric Worlds of Sun Ra, Volume Two (Saturn, 1966)
 Nothing Is (ESP-Disk, 1970)
 Heliocentric Worlds Vol. 3 (The Lost Tapes) (ESP-Disk, 2005)
 The Heliocentric Worlds of Sun Ra, Vols. 1-3 (compilation) (ESP-Disk, 2010)
 Heliocentric Worlds 1 & 2 Revisited (compilation) (Ezz-thetics, 2020)

References

American jazz drummers
Musicians from New York City
1938 births
Living people
20th-century American drummers
American male drummers
Jazz musicians from New York (state)
20th-century American male musicians
American male jazz musicians